Replay is a 2001 French-Canadian drama film directed by Catherine Corsini. It was entered into the 2001 Cannes Film Festival.

Plot 
La Répétition tracks the intimate on-and-off friendship between a stage actress (Béart) and her doormat disciple (Bussières). A French film with some Canadian actors and financing.

Cast
 Emmanuelle Béart as Nathalie
 Pascale Bussières as Louise
 Dani Levy as Matthias (as Dani Lévy)
 Jean-Pierre Kalfon as Walter Amar
 Sami Bouajila as Nicolas
 Marilu Marini as Mathilde
 Clément Hervieu-Léger as Sacha
 Marc Ponette as Alain
 Raphaël Neal as Patrick
 Sébastien Gorteau as Jean-Philippe
 Vincent Macaigne as Henri

References

External links

2001 films
2001 drama films
2001 LGBT-related films
2000s French-language films
French drama films
French LGBT-related films
Films directed by Catherine Corsini
Lesbian-related films
LGBT-related drama films
2000s French films